Nelson Dingley Jr. (February 15, 1832 – January 13, 1899) was a journalist and politician from the U.S. state of Maine.

Dingley was born in Durham, Maine and attended the common schools at Unity, Maine and Waterville College (now Colby College). He graduated from Dartmouth College in Hanover, New Hampshire, in 1855, where he was a founding member of the Psi Epsilon Chapter of the Zeta Psi Fraternity. He then studied law, received an LL.D. from Bates College, and was admitted to the bar in 1856. However, he never practiced law and instead became proprietor and editor of the Lewiston, Maine Journal, holding this post for more than twenty years. He was a member of the Maine House of Representatives 1862–65, 1868, and again in 1873, serving as speaker in 1863 and 1864. He was the 34th Governor of Maine in 1874 and a delegate to the Republican National Convention in 1876 and 1880.

Dingley was elected as a Republican to the 47th Congress to fill the vacancy caused by the resignation of William P. Frye. He was then reelected to the 48th and to the seven succeeding Congresses, serving from September 12, 1881, until his death in Washington, D.C., before the close of the 55th Congress. Reputedly "destitute of humor but soundly versed in finance", Dingley was chairman of the U.S. House Committee on Ways and Means in the 54th and 55th Congresses. The tariff schedule of 1897, known as the Dingley Tariff, was framed under his direction to counter the lower rates set forth in the 1894 Democratic Wilson–Gorman Tariff Act. The Dingley Tariff raised tariff rates and granted the President authority to invoke reciprocity when negotiating trade treaties.

Dingley had been reelected to the 56th Congress and was succeeded by Charles E. Littlefield upon his death in Washington, D.C. on January 13, 1899. He is interred in Oak Hill Cemetery, near Auburn, Maine.

See also

List of United States Congress members who died in office (1790–1899)

External links
The Life and Times of Nelson Dingley Jr. (Google Books)
Bio from House Ways and Means Committee

|-

|-

|-

1832 births
1899 deaths
Colby College alumni
Bates College alumni
Journalists from Maine
Dartmouth College alumni
Republican Party governors of Maine
People from Durham, Maine
Baptists from Maine
American magazine editors
Republican Party members of the United States House of Representatives from Maine
19th-century American journalists
American male journalists
19th-century American male writers
19th-century American politicians
19th-century Baptists